Wallace Hamilton Browne, Baron Browne of Belmont (born 29 October 1947), is a Democratic Unionist Party (DUP) politician, who has been a Member of the House of Lords since 2006, and was a Member of the Northern Ireland Assembly  (MLA) for East Belfast from 2007 to 2011.

Political career
Browne, a long-serving member of the DUP Central Executive; was a member of Belfast City Council for the Victoria electoral area from 1985 until 2010.

During his time on Belfast City Council, Browne was High Sheriff of the City in 2002 and Lord Mayor of Belfast in 2005–06.

In 2007, Browne was elected in the Assembly elections for the East Belfast seat. He remained a member of the Northern Ireland Assembly until 2011. During his time in the Assembly, he represented his party on various committees, including the Justice Committee, Culture and Arts Committee and the Audit Committee. Browne also served as Chairman of the Assembly Procedures Committee.

Since 2006, he has served in the House of Lords. He was one of the first three members of the DUP to be introduced to the second chamber as a life peer, giving the party its first-ever representation in the House of Lords. The other two being Maurice Morrow, the chairman of the DUP, and Eileen Paisley, the wife of the late Leader of the DUP, Ian Paisley; all became "working" life peers. Browne was raised to the peerage as Baron Browne of Belmont, of Belmont in County Antrim on 12 June 2006.

Browne has been an active working peer during his time in the House of Lords, regularly contributing to debates on a range of issues including: Restoration of the Devolved Institutions in Northern Ireland, Armed Forces Veterans, Military  Brexit, Historical Abuse and Gambling. In 2017, Browne secured the first focused debate in the House of Lords on the issue of online gambling.

Personal life
Before he was elected as a Member of the NI Assembly in 2007, Browne was previously a grammar school teacher. Browne was also a long-serving trustee of the Somme Association. Browne, a former pupil of Campbell College, Belfast is a graduate of Queen's University, Belfast graduating in 1970 with a Degree in Zoology

See also
 List of Northern Ireland Members of the House of Lords

References

External links
Four new unionist peers appointed, BBC News,  11 April 2006
Former Lord Mayor's Portrait Unveiled Belfast City Council

1947 births
Living people
Alumni of Queen's University Belfast
Democratic Unionist Party MLAs
Northern Ireland MLAs 2007–2011
High Sheriffs of Belfast
Democratic Unionist Party life peers
Lord Mayors of Belfast
Members of Belfast City Council
Place of birth missing (living people)
Life peers created by Elizabeth II